The 2012–13 Liga Nacional de Hockey Hielo season was the 39th season of the Liga Nacional de Hockey Hielo, the top level of ice hockey in Spain. Six teams participated in the league, and CD Hielo Bipolo won the championship.

Regular season 

(Note: The game between CH Jaca and CG Puigcerdá at the end of the season was not played because both teams playoff positions were already determined.)

Playoffs

Semifinals 
 CD Hielo Bipolo - CH Txuri Urdin 2:0 (5:2, 4:1)
 CH Jaca - CG Puigcerdà 0:2 (4:5, 3:8)

Final 
 CD Hielo Bipolo - CG Puigcerdà 3:0 (5:2, 5:3, 7:6)

External links 
 Spanish Ice Hockey Federation

Spa
Liga Nacional de Hockey Hielo seasons
Liga